"Wait" is the debut single by Australian recording artist Gyan from her self-titled debut album. The song was released in August 1989 as the album's lead single and peaked at number 14 on the ARIA charts.

At the ARIA Music Awards of 1990, the song was nominated for ARIA Award for Breakthrough Artist - single.

In 2015, Gyan re-recorded the track for her album This Girl's in Love, retitling it "Wait #2".

Track listings
CD/7" single
 "Wait" - 3:42
 "Love in Question" - 3:42

Charts

Weekly charts

Year-end charts

References

1989 debut singles
1989 songs